The men's foil was one of seven fencing events on the fencing at the 1932 Summer Olympics programme. It was the eighth appearance of the event. The competition was held from 2 to 4 August 1932. 26 fencers from 12 nations competed, with one other entered but not starting. Each nation was limited to three fencers. The event was won by Gustavo Marzi of Italy, the nation's third victory in the men's foil (and first since 1920). His countryman Giulio Gaudini took bronze for the second consecutive Games, becoming the fourth man to win multiple medals in the event. Joe Levis gave the United States its first men's foil medal with his silver.

Background

This was the eighth appearance of the event, which has been held at every Summer Olympics except 1908 (when there was a foil display only rather than a medal event). Four of the 1928 finalists returned: silver medalist Erwin Casmir of Germany, bronze medalist Giulio Gaudini of Italy, fifth-place finisher (and 1920 and 1924 silver medalist) Philippe Cattiau of France, and eleventh-place finisher Joe Levis of the United States. Another significant Olympic veteran was 1928 semifinalist  Ivan Joseph Martin Osiier of Denmark; Osiier was competing in the Games for the sixth time of his eventual seven. The favorite was Gustavo Marzi of Italy. Gaudini, who had won the world championship in 1930, was also a significant contender. The 1931 world champion, René Lemoine, had failed to make the French team.

Canada and Mexico each made their debut in the men's foil. The United States made its seventh appearance, most of any nation, having missed only the inaugural 1896 competition.

Competition format

The event used a three-round format. In each round, the fencers were divided into pools to play a round-robin within the pool. Bouts were to five touches. Not all bouts were played in some pools if not necessary to determine advancement. Bout wins were used for placement, regardless of losses if fencers had competed in a different number of bouts (e.g., 3–3 Gorordo and 3–2 Every were tied in the first round). Touches against was used as the tie-breaker. Standard foil rules were used, including that touches had to be made with the tip of the foil, the target area was limited to the torso, and priority determined the winner of double touches.
 Quarterfinals: There were 3 pools of 8–9 fencers each. The top 6 fencers in each quarterfinal advanced to the semifinals.
 Semifinals: There were 2 pools of 9 fencers each. The top 5 fencers in each semifinal advanced to the final.
 Final: The final pool had 10 fencers.

Schedule

Results

Quarterfinals
The top 6 finishers in each pool advanced to the semifinals.

Quarterfinal 1

Quarterfinal 2

Quarterfinal 3

Semifinals
The top 5 finishers in each semifinal advanced to the final.

Semifinal 1

Semifinal 2

Final

References

Foil men
Men's events at the 1932 Summer Olympics